Columbia County is a county located in the U.S. state of Washington.  As of the 2020 census, the population was 3,952, making it the second-least populous county in Washington. The county seat and largest city is Dayton. The county was created out of Walla Walla County on November 11, 1875, and is named after the Columbia River (which does not flow through the county). Columbia County is included in the Walla Walla, WA Metropolitan Statistical Area.

Geography
It is part of the Palouse, a wide and rolling prairie-like region of the middle Columbia basin.

Geographic features
Snake River
Blue Mountains
Touchet River
Tucannon River

Major highways
 U.S. Route 12

Adjacent counties
Whitman County - north
Garfield County - east
Wallowa County, Oregon - southeast
Umatilla County, Oregon - southwest
Walla Walla County - west
Franklin County - northwest

National protected area
Umatilla National Forest (part)

Demographics

2000 census
As of the census of 2000, there were 4,064 people, 1,687 households, and 1,138 families living in the county.  The population density was 5 people per square mile (2/km2).  There were 2,018 housing units at an average density of 2 per square mile (1/km2).  The racial makeup of the county was 93.73% White, 0.22% Black or African American, 0.96% Native American, 0.42% Asian, 0.05% Pacific Islander, 2.73% from other races, and 1.89% from two or more races.  6.35% of the population were Hispanic or Latino of any race. 19.6% were of German, 18.2% United States or American, 14.3% English and 8.3% Irish ancestry. 94.3% spoke English and 5.7% Spanish at home.

There were 1,687 households, out of which 27.70% had children under the age of 18 living with them, 56.00% were married couples living together, 8.50% had a female householder with no husband present, and 32.50% were non-families. 29.00% of all households were made up of individuals, and 13.00% had someone living alone who was 65 years of age or older.  The average household size was 2.36 and the average family size was 2.89.

In the county, the population was spread out, with 23.90% under the age of 18, 7.00% from 18 to 24, 22.80% from 25 to 44, 27.70% from 45 to 64, and 18.50% who were 65 years of age or older.  The median age was 42 years. For every 100 females there were 95.20 males.  For every 100 females age 18 and over, there were 94.80 males.

The median income for a household in the county was $33,500, and the median income for a family was $44,038. Males had a median income of $33,690 versus $21,367 for females. The per capita income for the county was $17,374.  About 8.60% of families and 12.60% of the population were below the poverty line, including 15.90% of those under age 18 and 11.10% of those age 65 or over.

2010 census
As of the 2010 census, there were 4,078 people, 1,762 households, and 1,156 families living in the county. The racial makeup of the county was 93.0% white, 1.4% American Indian, 0.6% Asian, 0.3% Pacific islander, 0.3% black or African American, 1.7% from other races, and 2.7% from two or more races. Those of Hispanic or Latino origin made up 6.2% of the population. In terms of ancestry, 24.7% were German, 18.3% were English, 12.3% were Irish, and 7.0% were American.

Of the 1,762 households, 24.7% had children under the age of 18 living with them, 52.6% were married couples living together, 9.2% had a female householder with no husband present, 34.4% were non-families, and 29.3% of all households were made up of individuals. The average household size was 2.27 and the average family size was 2.76. The median age was 48.3 years.

The median income for a household in the county was $43,611 and the median income for a family was $53,452. Males had a median income of $45,000 versus $35,357 for females. The per capita income for the county was $25,810. About 9.8% of families and 16.4% of the population were below the poverty line, including 19.7% of those under age 18 and 10.9% of those age 65 or over.

Communities

City
Dayton (county seat)

Town
Starbuck

Unincorporated communities

Huntsville
Marengo
Turner

Politics
Columbia County is one of the most conservative counties in Washington state. It has not been carried by a Democrat for President since Lyndon Johnson's 1964 landslide victory, and the last time it backed a Democrat for Governor was in 1936 when conservative Democrat Clarence D. Martin swept every county in the state. Popular conservative Democratic Senator "Scoop" Jackson carried the county in four consecutive county sweeps (the last in 1982); since then, however, it has been powerfully Republican in those contests too.

See also
National Register of Historic Places listings in Columbia County, Washington

Notes

References

Further reading
 Frank T. Gilbert, Historic Sketches: Walla Walla, Columbia and Garfield Counties, Washington Territory. Portland, OR: A.G. Walling Printing House, 1882.
 W.D. Lyman, Lyman's History of Old Walla Walla County, Embracing Walla Walla, Columbia, Garfield and Asotin Counties. In Two Volumes. Chicago: S.J. Clarke Publishing Co., 1918. Volume 1 | Volume 2
 Frederic Ambrose Shaver, An Illustrated History of Southeastern Washington, Including Walla Walla, Columbia, Garfield and Asotin Counties, Washington. Spokane, WA: Western Historical Publishing Co., 1906.

External links

Official County Website
Pictures of Columbia County
Columbia County Heritage

 
1875 establishments in Washington Territory
Populated places established in 1875
Eastern Washington